Sonic Geology is a compilation album by Birdsongs of the Mesozoic, released on 1988 by Rykodisc. It collects tracks from the band's first three releases on Ace of Hearts Records as well as two previously unreleased pieces.

Track listing

Release history

References

External links 
 Sonic Geology at Discogs (list of releases)

1988 compilation albums
Birdsongs of the Mesozoic albums
Rykodisc albums